Kelsey (formerly, Kelsey's Diggings) is an unincorporated community in El Dorado County, California.

A post office operated at Kelsey from 1856 to 1872, from 1875 to 1903, with several moves, and from 1920. The name honors Benjamin Kelsey, who came to California in 1841 and discovered gold at the site in 1848. The town was first known as Kelsey's Diggings because of the mining there.

Education
The Black Oak Mine Unified School District serves Garden Valley.

Climate
The Köppen Climate Classification subtype for this climate is "Csa"(Mediterranean Climate).

References

Unincorporated communities in El Dorado County, California
Populated places in the Sierra Nevada (United States)
Populated places established in 1848
1848 establishments in California
Unincorporated communities in California